Thomas Brudenell may refer to:

Thomas Brudenell, 1st Earl of Cardigan (1583–1663), English peer and Royalist soldier
Thomas Brudenell (British Army officer, died 1707), British Army officer

See also
Thomas Brudenell-Bruce (disambiguation)
Brudenell (disambiguation)